Sulagiri is the official name of the meteorite which fell on 12 September 2008 in Sulagiri, Krishnagiri District, Tamil Nadu, India.

History 
On 12 September 2008, around 08:30 hours, from the north-west sky this meteorite fell, which was observed by several people residing in the villages around the town of Sulaguri. According to the eyewitnesses, they heard a screeching sound and a bang. It was followed by house shaking explosions. Bright flashes and smoke were also observed.

References 

 

September 2008 events in India
2000s in Tamil Nadu
Meteorites found in India